Sagen is a surname and a given name which can also be spelt "Sagan". This may refer to:

Anette Sagen (born 1985), Norwegian ski jumper
Lyder Sagen (1777–1850), Norwegian educator and author.
Rolf Sagen (1940–2017), Norwegian author, curator and daily leader of the Bergen Academy of Writing
Sagen Ishizuka (1850–1909), Japanese doctor who pioneered the concepts of shokuiku (food education) and the macrobiotic diet

See also
Sagan (disambiguation)

Norwegian-language surnames